Teuvo Ojala (19 August 1947 – 8 February 1991) was a Finnish wrestler. He competed in the men's Greco-Roman 87 kg at the 1968 Summer Olympics.

References

External links
 

1947 births
1991 deaths
Finnish male sport wrestlers
Olympic wrestlers of Finland
Wrestlers at the 1968 Summer Olympics
People from Lappajärvi
Sportspeople from South Ostrobothnia